Hibbertia incompta is a species of flowering plant in the family Dilleniaceae and is endemic to the Northern Territory. It is a weakly stemmed, often prostrate shrublet with hairy foliage, linear to elliptic leaves, and yellow flowers arranged in leaf axils with 45 to 60 stamens arranged in groups around the two or three carpels.

Description
As the leaves age, the edges roll under and the leaves become narrower. There are 45 to 60 stamens arranged in groups around the two or three carpels, each carpel with four ovules.

Taxonomy
Hibbertia incompta was first formally described in 2010 by Hellmut R. Toelken in the Journal of the Adelaide Botanic Gardens from specimens collected near Jabiru in 1981. The specific epithet (incompta) means "inelegant", referring to the wildly spreading hairs on the lower side of the leaves.

Distribution and habitat
This hibbertia grows in woodland in sandy soil below the Arnhem Land Plateau in the northern part of the Northern Territory.

Conservation status
Hibbertia incompta is classified as "data deficient" under the Territory Parks and Wildlife Conservation Act 1976.

See also
List of Hibbertia species

References

incompta
Flora of the Northern Territory
Plants described in 2010
Taxa named by Hellmut R. Toelken